The International Federation of Building Workers (IFBW) was a global union federation bringing together unions representing masons.

History
The German Central Union of Masons gradually built up international contacts in the late 19th-century.  In 1903, it called a conference in Berlin, to formalise these relationships by establishing an international trade federation.

The federation was established as the Building Workers' International, and was based in Hamburg from its foundation.  By 1925, most of its member unions had merged with the carpenters' unions in their country, and so it agreed to absorb the Carpenters' International.  This gave it 26 affiliates, with a total of 756,059 members.

On 1 April 1934, the federation merged with the International Federation of Wood Workers, to form the International Federation of Building and Wood Workers.

Affiliates
The following unions were affiliated as of 1922:

General Secretaries
1903: Theodor Bömelburg
1913: Fritz Paeplow
1919: Georg Käppler
1933: Jaap van Achterbergh

Presidents
1919: Fritz Paeplow
1927:
1933: Nikolaus Bernhard

References

Trade unions established in 1903
Trade unions disestablished in 1934
International Federation of Building and Wood Workers